Cucujiformia is an infraorder of polyphagan beetles, representing most plant-eating beetles.

The infraorder contains the seven superfamilies:
 Chrysomeloidea (~7 families including longhorn beetles and leaf beetles)
 Cleroidea (checkered beetles, bark-gnawing beetles and soft-winged flower beetles)
 Coccinelloidea (15 families, includes ladybirds and fungus beetles)
 Cucujoidea (~27 families)
 Curculionoidea (~8 families primarily consisting of weevils and also including snout beetles and bark beetles)
 Lymexyloidea (ship-timber beetles)
 Tenebrionoidea (formerly "Heteromera") (30 families including blister beetles and ant-like beetles)

References

External links

 
Insect infraorders
Taxa named by Auguste Lameere